Graham Bradley was a professional horse racer and a member of the National Hunt Jockey Club. On November 29, 2002 he was banned from the Club for breaking six of its rules.

Career 
Throughout his career, Bradley had many horseracing wins including: riding Bregawn – Michael Dickinson’s Cheltenham Gold Cup (1983) winner, the Champion Hurdle on Collier Bay (1996) and the Grand National Hennessy Gold Cup (1997).

Following his ban from the Club, Bradley set out to become a horseracing trainer, but he abandoned this plan in 2015.

Winning horses 
Since his retirement in 1999 Bradley has purchased a few champion horses.  Seebald won seven races before finishing second in the Irish Independent Arkle Challenge Trophy at the Cheltenham Festival in 2002.

Controversy 
Bradley has received various punishments over the years including:

 1982: withdrawal of license for two months due to bet placement at Cartmel,
 1987: banned for five months under the "non-triers" rule after a race at Market Rasen,
 1987: fined £2,500 for trying to end the race at the Cheltenham Gold Cup, anticipating unfavorable conditions for Forgive 'N' Forget,
 1988: heavily fined alongside Geoff Harker due to missing both a fence and an entire circuit at the Sedgefield races
 1996: pulled up Man Mood, the odds-on favourite, in a race at Warwick,
 1999: Jockey Club licence suspension and racehorse access restricted following the Metropolitan Police’s charge against him. The charges were filed against him on April 13, 1999 due to the incident in 1996. Two months later this was rescinded by Crown Prosecution Service which withdrew the charges against him since the original charge was subject to review. The rules he broke were: 204 (iv),  Rule 62(ii)(c), Rule 220(vii)(b), Rule 220(viii) Rule 220(iii) and Rule 140.

Throughout the 1990's, an investigation into Bradley's actions occurred due to concerns about race fixing. These events were what led to his retirement. In 2014, Bradley was cleared of charges alleging he was training horses under the name of Brendan Powell. In 2019, Irish authorities allowed Bradley to register as a racehorse owner. Marchons Ensemble came second in his name. Bradley has been referred to as “one of racing’s most controversial characters".

Publications 
The Wayward Lad was a Ghost-written autobiography on him by Steve Taylor.

References 

British jockeys
British racehorse owners and breeders
Living people
Year of birth missing (living people)